Clarksdale is an unincorporated community in Christian County, Illinois, United States, located at 39.4897708 latitude and -89.3678699 longitude.

External links
 
 NACO

Unincorporated communities in Christian County, Illinois
Unincorporated communities in Illinois